The Ministry of Municipality of Qatar is the ministry that provides municipal  services to citizens and residents in Qatar. The current minister is Abdulla bin Abdulaziz bin Turki Al Subaie.

Ministry history 
The First establishment of the Ministry of Municipal Affairs in the State of Qatar was in 1972, under Decree by Law No. (24), which has defined the responsibilities of the Ministry and its affiliate Departments. Thereafter, these responsibilities had been amended in 1990, following the cancellation of the Ministry of Industry and Agriculture, and the addition of the agricultural affairs to the Ministry of Municipal Affairs, thence renamed the Ministry of Municipal Affairs and Agriculture (at a time). Later on, these responsibilities were subsequently modified following the merger of the Ministry of Public Works and the Ministry of Municipal Affairs and Agriculture under the Decree by Law No. (20) of 1993, on the organization of the Ministry of Municipal Affairs and Agriculture and defining its responsibilities. The Public Works responsibilities has also been added to the responsibilities of this Ministry. In 2004, Law No. (1) on the establishment of the Public Works Authority, followed by the Law No. 15 of 2004 on the establishment of the Urban Planning & Development Authority, and thus the responsibilities of the Ministry has been limited to the municipal and agricultural affairs. The Ministry had been re-organized and the its responsibilities defined under the Law No. (23) of 2005. On Mai 5, 2009, the Emiri Decision No. (16) of 2009, on the specification of the functions of the Ministries, including the authorities of the Ministry of Municipality and Urban Planning, has been issued. On January 27, 2016, the Emiri Decision No. (5) of 2016, on the Organization Chart for the Ministry of Municipality and Environment, has been issued. On October 19, 2021, Emiri Resolution No. (57) for the year 2021 was issued separating the environment from the Ministry of Municipality and assigning the functions of the Ministry of Municipality.

Ministry tasks 
The Ministry of Municipality is responsible for everything related to municipal affairs:

 Preparation of urban plans at the State level, and Supervising its implementation in coordination with the concerned authorities.
 Land surveying and subdivisions.
 Preparation of cadastral maps of the State of Qatar.
 Management of State properties.
 Provision & Allocation of lands for the needs of government authorities.
 Reviewing the recommendations of the Central Municipal Council.
 Land expropriation & temporary Land Acquisition for the public interest.
 Suggestion and implementation of municipal projects including buildings, gardens, parks and landscaping plantations, besides monitoring buildings construction and buildings control.
 Preparation and implementation of systems and programs for public cleansing.
 Supervising the practice of engineering professions, and the cemeteries, and providing honoring tributes to the deceased.

Sources:

In the sectors of agriculture and fisheries affairs, the ministry is concerned with achieving several goals, foremost of which is the development of agricultural, water, animal and fish wealth in a way that achieves sustainable development, and proposing and implementing policies necessary to achieve food security and overseeing strategic food stocks. The ministry is working to generalize the provision of electronic services to the public as part of its efforts to abolish paper transactions within the state's e-government.

References 

Government of Qatar
Ministries established in 1972
1972 establishments in Qatar
Government ministries of Qatar